Kawana is a surname. Notable people with the surname include:

 Albert Kawana (born 1956), Namibian politician
 Koichi Kawana (born 1930), Japanese academic
 Machiko Kawana (born 1983), Japanese voice actress
 Mariko Kawana (born 1967), Japanese actress
 Nicola Kawana (born 1970), New Zealand actress

Japanese-language surnames